Orsay-Ville station (French: Gare d'Orsay-Ville) is a RER B station in the town of Orsay, near Paris, in France. This is one of the stations for University of Paris-Sud.

Bus lines from this station
Many bus lines stop at this station, from many cities around:
 Les Ulis
 Limours
 Bures-sur-Yvette
 Saclay

Réseau Express Régional stations
Railway stations in Essonne
Railway stations in France opened in 1854